Stefano "Sabo" Gross (born 4 September 1986) is a World Cup alpine ski racer from northern Italy. Born in Bozen, South Tyrol, Gross was raised in Pozza di Fassa in Trentino; he races in the technical events and specializes in the slalom.

Career
Gross made his World Cup debut at Alta Badia in December 2008, and his best results are three podiums in slalom in 2015, including a victory in Adelboden. Gross has represented Italy at seven World Championships and finished tenth in the slalom in 2017. He was fourth in the slalom at the 2014 Winter Olympics.

World Cup results

Season standings

Race podiums
 1 win – (1 SL)
 12 podiums – (11 SL, 1 PSL)

World Championship results

Olympic results

References

External links

 
Italian Winter Sports Federation – (FISI) – alpine skiing – Stefano Gross – 
Völkl Skis – team – Stefano Gross

Italian male alpine skiers
1986 births
Living people
Sportspeople from Bolzano
Alpine skiers at the 2014 Winter Olympics
Alpine skiers at the 2018 Winter Olympics
Olympic alpine skiers of Italy
Alpine skiers of Fiamme Gialle